is a Japanese voice actress and singer. She was previously affiliated with Early Wing, but is now a freelancer. She is known for voicing prominent roles in anime such as and Sayaka Miki in Puella Magi Madoka Magica, Saya Otonashi in Blood+, Keqing in Genshin Impact, Shizuku in New Game!, Darjeeling in Girls und Panzer, Uni/Black Sister in Hyperdimension Neptunia, Ranko Honjō in My First Girlfriend Is a Gal,  Yuka Mochida in Corpse Party, Bea in Pokémon: Twilight Wings, and Miki Aono/Cure Berry in Fresh Pretty Cure!. In addition, she provided the voice for Vocaloid CUL-REBIRTH. She is known to be an amateur manga artist in Japan in her spare time.

Filmography

Television animation

Original video animation (OVA)
Aruvu Rezuru: Kikaijikake no Yōseitachi – Shiki Mikage
Durarara!! – Mairu Orihara
Fairy Tail: Welcome to Fairy Hills!! – Cana Alberona, Aquarius
ICE – Mint
Indian Summer (2007, OVA) – Yui
My-Otome 0~S.ifr~ – Sister Hermana Shion
Princess Resurrection – Riza Wildman
Super Street Fighter IV OVA – Juri Han
Corpse Party: Missing Footage – Yuka Mochida
Corpse Party: Tortured Souls – Yuka Mochida
Yamada-kun and the Seven Witches (2014, OVA) – Nene Odagiri
Yasuke, Ishikawa

Films
Fresh Pretty Cure: The Toy Kingdom has Many Secrets!? (2009) – Miki Aono/Cure Berry
Pretty Cure All Stars film series (2009–2016) – Miki Aono/Cure Berry
Break Blade film series (2010–2011) – Leto
Ao no Exorcist the Movie (2012) – Izumo Kamiki
Fairy Tail the Movie: Phoenix Priestess (2012) – Cana Alberona, Aquarius
Puella Magi Madoka Magica: The Movie film trilogy (2012–2013) – Sayaka Miki
 Puella Magi Madoka Magica: Rebellion (2013, third film) – Sayaka
 Girls und Panzer der Film (2015) - Darjeeling, Tsuchiya
 A Whisker Away (2020) - Kinako

Video games
Super Street Fighter IV (2010) – Juri Han
Senran Kagura Burst (2011) – Homura
Street Fighter X Tekken (2012) – Juri Han
Lollipop Chainsaw (2012) – Juliet Starling; as default setting in Xbox 360
Project X Zone (2012) – Juri Han
Senran Kagura Shinovi Versus (2013) – Homura
Super Heroine Chronicle (2014) – Yase
Senran Kagura 2: Deep Crimson (2014) – Homura
Senran Kagura: Estival Versus (2015) – Homura
Project X Zone 2 (2015) – Juri Han
JoJo's Bizarre Adventure: Eyes of Heaven (2015) – Yasuho Hirose
Street Fighter V (2016) – Juri Han
World of Final Fantasy (2016) – Serafie
Dissidia Final Fantasy Opera Omnia (2017) – Papalymo
Azur Lane (2018) – IJN Hiei
Genshin Impact (2020) - Keqing
Nier Reincarnation (2021) – Akeha
Street Fighter 6 (2023) – Juri Han

Unknown date
Alchemy Stars – Michenny
Ar tonelico III – Finnel
Arknights – Beeswax, Carnelian
Ash Arms – M41 Bulldog, Ram Mk.I
Astral Chain – Breanda Moreno
Atelier Rorona: The Alchemist of Arland – Cordelia von Feuerbach
Atelier Totori: The Adventurer of Arland – Cordelia von Feuerbach
Chaos;Head – Rimi Sakihata
Chaos;Head Love Chu Chu! – Rimi Sakihata
Corpse Party: BloodCovered: ...Repeated Fear – Yuka Mochida
Corpse Party: Book of Shadows – Yuka Mochida
Corpse Party: BloodDrive – Yuka Mochida
Corpse Party: Sachiko's Game of Love ♥ Hysteric Birthday 2U – Yuka Mochida
DC Super Hero Girls: Teen Power – Batgirl / Barbara Gordon
Death End Request – Ripuka
Dengeki Gakuen RPG: Cross of Venus – Kizuna Kasugai
Disgaea 4: A Promise Unforgotten – Vulcanus
Do-Don-Pachi Saidaioujou – Type-B Hikari
Dragalia Lost – Cerberus, Grace
Dream Club – Mio
Final Fantasy XIV: A Realm Reborn – Papalymo
Girls' Frontline – M21, Stechkin APS
Girls' Frontline: Project Neural Cloud (2022) – Willow
Graffiti Smash - Salva
Granblue Fantasy – Cerberus
Heroes Phantasia – Saya Otonashi
Hyperdimension Neptunia Mk2 – Uni
Hyperdimension Neptunia Victory – Uni
Koumajou Densetsu II: Stranger's Requiem – Remilia Scarlet, Sunny Milk
Koumajou Remilia: Scarlet Symphony – Remilia Scarlet
Luminous Arc 3 – Yuu
Lux-Pain – Nöla Döbereiner
Magia Record: Puella Magi Madoka Magica Side Story – Sayaka Miki
Megadimension Neptunia VII – Uni
Abyss of the Sacrifice – Asuna
No More Heroes: Heroes' Paradise – Shinobu
Negai no Kakera to Hakugin no Agreement – Aizawa Makoto
New Class of Heroes: Chrono Academy – Abner
Our World is Ended - Asano Hayase
Phantasy Star Online 2 – Quna
Pokémon Masters EX – Bea
Puella Magi Madoka Magica Portable – Sayaka Miki
Puella Magi Madoka Magica: The Battle Pentagram – Sayaka Miki
Rewrite – Akane Senri
Rune Factory 3 – Collette
Shinkyoku Soukai Polyphonica – Snow Drop
Show By Rock!! - Retoree
SINoALICE - Cinderella
Tatsunoko vs. Capcom: Cross Generation of Heroes/Ultimate All Stars – Gan-chan aka Yatterman No. 1
Tales of Phantasia: Narikiri Dungeon X – Rondoline E. Effenberg
Toki to Towa – Towa
Tokyo Babel – Samael
Toradora! Portable – Ami Kawashima
Umineko When They Cry – Chiester 410
Valkyria Chronicles II – Cosette Coalhearth
Valkyria Chronicles III – Cosette Coalhearth
Valkyrie Anatomia - The Origin – Kokuyō
Venus Eleven Vivid! – Morgan

Drama CD
 Karneval (xxxx) – Kiichi
 Oresama Teacher (xxxx) – Mafuyu Kurosaki
 Ys II (2010) – Lilia

Tokusatsu

Japanese dub

Live-active
Confidential Assignment – Park Min-young (Yoona)
Dear Eleanor – Max the Wax (Isabelle Fuhrman)
Detective Dee: The Four Heavenly Kings – Moon Water (Sandra Ma)
Fantastic Beasts: The Crimes of Grindelwald – Vinda Rosier (Poppy Corby-Tuech)
Fantastic Beasts: The Secrets of Dumbledore – Vinda Rosier (Poppy Corby-Tuech)
Pretty Little Liars: Original Sin – Karen and Kelly Beasley (Mallory Bechtel)
Single Rider – Ji-na (Ahn So-hee)
Train to Busan – Jin-hee (Ahn So-hee)

Animation
DC Super Hero Girls – Batgirl
Lego Monkie Kid – Princess Iron Fan

Discography

Singles
 "Before the Moment" - April 21, 2004
  - August 8, 2008
 "Realize" - July 23, 2008
 "Guilty Future" - January 21, 2009
 "Be Starters!" - August 10, 2011
  - November 9, 2011
 "Happy Girl" - February 8, 2012
 "Destiny" - November 7, 2012
 "Miracle Gliders" - January 9, 2013
 "Birth" - August 7, 2013
 "Tenohira -Show- (掌-show-)" - May 14, 2014
 "Rinrei (凛麗)" - October 29, 2014

Album
 "Re;Story" - July 25, 2012
 "Shomei" (証×明) - April 9, 2014
 "Revolution 【re:i】" - March 22, 2017 (Mini Album)

Other
2004
 Mermaid Melody Pichi Pichi Pitch "Before the Moment"
 Mermaid Melody Pichi Pichi Pitch "Beautiful Wish"
 Mermaid Melody Pichi Pichi Pitch "Birth of Love"
 Zatch Bell "Tsuyogari"
 Kuryū Yōma Gakuenki "Aokikiyoku"

2007
 Tōka Gettan "Yume Oboro" (with Mariya Ise and Saori Hayami)
 Idolmasters XENOGLOSSIA "Honoo no Sadame"
 Seto no Hanayome "Rasen"
 Kodomo no Jikan "Rettsu! Ohime-Sama Dakko!" (with Kei Shindō and Mai Kadowaki)
 Kodomo no Jikan "Otome Chikku Shoshinsha Desu" (with Kei Shindō and Mai Kawadoki)
 Koharu Biyori "Apron Dake wa Toranaide"
 Koharu Biyori "Oppai wa Dame"
 Koharu Biyori "Love Song kamo Shirenai" (with Satomi Akesaka)
 Kodomo no Jikan "Sensei.. Hajimete Desu Ka?"

2008
 ToraDora! "Pre-Parade" (with Rie Kugimiya and Yui Horie)
 ToraDora! "Ka Ra Ku Ri" (with Rie Kugimiya and Yui Horie)
 Seto no Hanayome "Mirai He Go" (with Rika Morinaga)

2009
 ToraDora! "Orange" (with Rie Kugimiya and Yui Horie)
 ToraDora! "Yes!"
 ToraDora! "Holy Night" (with Rie Kugimiya)
 ToraDora! "Complete" (with Rie Kugimiya and Yui Horie)
 ToraDora! "Please Freeze" (with Rie Kugimiya and Yui Horie)
 Minami-ke "Seenotsu" (with Aki Toyosaki)
 NEEDLESS "Aggressive Zone" (with Aya Endo, Yui Makino, Emiri Katō and Saori Gotō)
 NEEDLESS "WANTED! for the love" (with Aya Endo, Yui Makino, Emiri Katō and Saori Gotō)
 BLOOD + "Ashita he... shining future"
 Kodomo no Jikan "Guilty Future"

2010
 Working!! "SOMEONE ELSE" (with Kana Asumi and Saki Fujita)

2011
 Onii-chan no Koto Nanka Zenzen Suki Janain Dakara ne "Taste of Paradise"
 Onii-chan no Koto Nanka Zenzen Suki Janain Dakara ne "YELL ~Whistle wa Sono Mune ni~"
 Onii-chan no Koto Nanka Zenzen Suki Janain Dakara ne "Ari Ari Mirai*" (with Marina Inoue and Kazusa Aranami)
 Onii-chan no Koto Nanka Zenzen Suki Janain Dakara ne "Kimi ni OVERFLOW" (with Marina Inoue and Kazusa Aranami)
 Onii-chan no Koto Nanka Zenzen Suki Janain Dakara ne "Thrilling Everyday"
 Onii-chan no Koto Nanka Zenzen Suki Janain Dakara ne "Catch My HOPE"
 Sengoku Otome: Momoiro Paradox "SENGOKU GROOVE" (with Rina Hidaka, Megumi Toyoguchi and Yuka Hirata)
 Puella Magi Madoka Magica "And I'm Home" (with Ai Nonaka)
 Working!! "Colorful Days"
 Working!! "Wagnaria Sanga ~ A day of Todoroki Yachiyo"
 Working'!! "Coolish Walk" (with Kana Asumi and Saki Fujita)
 Mayo Chiki! "Be Starters!"
 Mayo Chiki! "Kimi Ni Gohoushi" (with Yuka Iguchi and Mariya Ise)
 Mayo Chiki! "Give Me Everything"
 Papa no Iu Koto o Kikinasai! (Listen to Me, Girls. I Am Your Father!) "Happy Girl"
 Papa no Iu Koto o Kikinasai! (Listen to Me, Girls. I Am Your Father!) "Brilliant Days"
 C3 -CubexCursedxCurious "Hana"
 C3 -CubexCursedxCurious "Shirushi"

2012
 C3 -CubexCursedxCurious "My Wish"
 ToraDora! "√HAPPYEND" (with Rie Kugimiya and Yui Horie)
 Nisemonogatari "marshmallow justice"
 Papa no Iu Koto o Kikinasai! (PSP Game) "Smile Continue" (with Sumire Uesaka and Hiromi Iragashi)
 Haiyore! Nyaruko-san "Kurogane no Striver" (with Hatano Wataru)
 Hakusei Renai Shoukougun RE:Therapy "You never know"
 Onii-chan dakedo Ai sae Areba Kankeinai yo ne! "LifeRU is LoveRU!!" (with Ibuki Kido, Minori Chihara, and Asami Shimoda)

2013
 Kami-sama no Inai Nichiyōbi "Birth"

Notes

References

External links

Eri Kitamura StarChild Profile 
Eri Kitamura TMS Music Profile 
Eri Kitamura profile 

Eri Kitamura at GamePlaza-Haruka Voice Acting Database 

1987 births
Living people
Anime singers
Japanese women rock singers
Japanese video game actresses
Japanese voice actresses
King Records (Japan) artists
Singers from Tokyo
People from Fuchū, Tokyo
Vocaloid voice providers
Voice actresses from Tokyo Metropolis
21st-century Japanese actresses
21st-century Japanese singers
21st-century Japanese women singers